Scotland Bill can refer to:
 the proposed legislation for Scottish home rule presented to the UK Parliament in 1977, which became the Scotland Act 1978 (subsequently repealed)
 the proposed legislation for Scottish devolution presented to the UK Parliament in 1997, which became the Scotland Act 1998
 the proposed legislation to amend the Scotland Act 1998 to devolve further power to Scotland, presented to the UK Parliament in 2010, which became the Scotland Act 2012
 the proposed legislation to extend the powers of the Scottish Parliament in 2015 via the Scotland Bill 2015-16